Ghanzi Airport  is a port of entry airport serving Ghanzi, a town in the Ghanzi District of Botswana.  The airport is adjacent to the town.

There is currently no scheduled service, only charter and private operations.

See also
Transport in Botswana
List of airports in Botswana

References

External links
Civil Aviation Authority of Botswana
OpenStreetMap - Ghanzi
OurAirports - Ghanzi
SkyVector - Ghanzi
Ghanzi

Ghanzi
Airports in Botswana